Glyphostoma purpurascens is a species of sea snail, a marine gastropod mollusk in the family Clathurellidae.

Description
The color of the shell is rose-red to violaceous, with a central white band. The outer lip is 5-6 toothed within. The shell has a length of 5 mm.

Distribution
This species occurs in the Indian Ocean along Madagascar.

References

 Dautzenberg, Ph. (1929). Mollusques testacés marins de Madagascar. Faune des Colonies Francaises, Tome III

purpurascens
Gastropods described in 1871